Muhsen Basma (born October 21, 1966) is a former Syrian football referee. He has been a FIFA international referee since 2003. He has refereed games at 2007 AFC Asian Cup, a semifinal of the AFC Champions League 2008 and qualifiers for 2006 FIFA World Cup and 2010 FIFA World Cup.

References

1966 births
Living people
Syrian football referees
AFC Asian Cup referees